Danielle Anne Brisebois (born June 28, 1969) is an American producer, singer-songwriter and former child actress. She is best known for her role as Stephanie Mills on the Norman Lear-produced sitcoms All in the Family and its spin-off Archie Bunker's Place (for which she was nominated for a Golden Globe Award), as well as playing Molly in the original Broadway production of the musical Annie.

After she retired from acting in the late 1980s, Brisebois pursued a music career. She was one of the two permanent members of the short-lived rock band New Radicals, along with her longtime songwriting partner Gregg Alexander, and served as the group's keyboardist, percussionist and backing vocalist. She has also recorded two solo albums, Arrive All Over You and Portable Life, both of which were produced by Alexander. She has written or co-written a number of songs, including Natasha Bedingfield's hit singles "Unwritten", and "Pocketful of Sunshine".

In January 2015, Brisebois and Alexander were nominated for an Academy Award for Best Original Song for the song "Lost Stars" from the film Begin Again.

Early life and acting career
Brisebois was born on June 28, 1969, in Brooklyn, New York, the daughter of Mary and Frank Brisebois, a computer instructor. She is of French-Canadian and Italian descent. She began her career as a child actress appearing in her first movie, The Premonition (1976), at the age of seven. In 1977, she appeared in an episode of Kojak and began starring in the original Broadway cast of Annie as the youngest of the orphans, Molly. (Jay-Z later sampled a clip of Brisebois from Annie for his song "Hard Knock Life (Ghetto Anthem)".) In the late 1970s, she joined the cast of All in the Family, then co-starred in its continuation Archie Bunker's Place from 1979 to 1983.  She was nominated for six Young Artist Awards from 1980 to 1984, winning two; in 1981 as Best Young Actress in a TV Special for Mom, the Wolfman and Me, and in 1982 as Best Young Actress in a Television Series for Archie Bunker's Place. In 1982, she was also nominated for a Golden Globe Award as Best Supporting Actress in a Series, Mini-Series or Motion Picture Made for TV, again for Archie Bunker's Place.

Brisebois appeared in several episodes of Battle of the Network Stars and Circus of the Stars in the early 1980s, and played the daughter of William Devane's character on Knots Landing in the series' fifth season. In the late 1980s, she made several single-episode appearances in various TV series, including Hotel, Mr. Belvedere, Murder, She Wrote, Tales from the Darkside, and Days of Our Lives. In 2005, she ranked number 50 of VH1's 100 Greatest Kid Stars.

Music career
Brisebois began her career as a recording artist in the early 1990s by providing backing vocals on Intoxifornication, the 1992 album by rock singer Gregg Alexander; this marked the beginning of a long-standing collaboration with Alexander, who co-wrote, produced and sang on her first solo album Arrive All Over You in 1994. Despite a disappointing commercial performance in the U.S, the album became a minor hit in Europe. Arrive All Over You performed well critically and continues to maintain a cult following. Mackenzie Wilson of Allmusic described the album as "an earnest and impressive effort ... [that] went largely unnoticed during the reign of gangsta rap and grunge," and compared it favorably to Alanis Morissette's Jagged Little Pill.<ref>{{cite web| website=Allmusic| title=Arrive All Over You review| url=}}</ref> Her cover of "Gimme Little Sign" was a minor hit in Europe.

In 1998, Brisebois became a member of Alexander's New Radicals group, who scored their greatest successes with the hit single "You Get What You Give", and the million-selling album Maybe You've Been Brainwashed Too. She provided distinctive female vocals to the group's sound on tracks such as "Mother We Just Can't Get Enough" and "Jehovah Made This Whole Joint For You". Alexander disbanded the group in 1999, but went on to produce and co-write Brisebois' second solo album Portable Life, which was originally scheduled to be released on October 26, 1999. Promotional copies of the album and the single "I've Had It" were distributed, reviews appeared in the press, and an "I've Had It" video was even shot, but for unknown reasons RCA Records cancelled the release at the last minute. The album was delayed until September 30, 2008, when it was released as a digital download via iTunes and Amazon.com. A compilation album of Arrive All Over You-era tracks, titled Just Missed the Train, was later released through Sony BMG on September 26, 2006. 

Brisebois has written and produced numerous songs for various other artists, including Carly Smithson, Clay Aiken, Kelly Clarkson, Sophie Ellis-Bextor, Paula Abdul, and Kylie Minogue. She co-wrote Natasha Bedingfield's Top 10 hits "Unwritten" and "Pocketful of Sunshine", and "Stamp Your Feet" for Donna Summer. In November 2008 she reunited with Alexander, former New Radicals guitarist Rusty Anderson, and producer Rick Nowels as The Not So Silent Majority. She sang lead vocals on their song "Obama Rock", supporting the election of Barack Obama. In 2009 she contributed two songs to the Leona Lewis album Echo, including "Alive" and "Let It Rain". Later that year, Danielle won big at the BMI Awards, both in the US and UK, with "Pocketful of Sunshine", including two of the top awards, the Robert S. Musel award for Song of the Year, and the College Song of the Year, as well as a third award for Film and Television for "Unwritten".

In 2012, Brisebois co-wrote the Halestorm song "Here's to Us", which was featured in a season three episode of Glee.

She also co-wrote songs for the feature film Begin Again (2013), including "Lost Stars", which was nominated for Best Original Song at the 2015 Academy Awards.

Filmography

Discography

Albums
 Arrive All over You (1994)
 Portable Life (1999, released in 2008)

Compilations
 Just Missed the Train (2006)

Singles
 "What If God Fell from the Sky" (1994)
 "Gimme Little Sign" (1995, #75 UK charts; #23 Swedish charts; #51 German charts)
 "I Don't Wanna Talk About Love" (1995)
 "I've Had It" (1999, promotional single only)

 Other 

 Annie (1977 Original Broadway Cast Recording) as Molly

 Songwriting credits 

 Paula Abdul
"I'm Just Here For the Music"
 Clay Aiken
"Perfect Day"
 David Archuleta
"Things Are Gonna Get Better"Begin Again soundtrack
"Lost Stars" by Adam Levine and Keira Knightley (also co-produced)
"Coming Up Roses" Keira Knightley (also co-produced)
"A Step You Can't Take Back" by Keira Knightley
 Natasha Bedingfield
"Unwritten" #1 Single Billboard Pop 100
"Pocketful of Sunshine" #5 Single Billboard Hot 100
"We're All Mad"
"Drop Me in the Middle"
"Piece of Your Heart"
"All I Need" featuring Kevin Rudolph
"Try"
"When You Know You Know"
"Good on Me" (B Side)
 Boyzone
"Love Is a Hurricane"
 Greyson Chance
"Light Up the Dark"
"Heart Like Stone"
"Purple Sky"
 Charice
"Lighthouse"
 Kelly Clarkson
"Just Missed the Train"
 Sophie Ellis-Bextor
"Fake Love to Me"
"Running Out"
 Dia Frampton
"Homeless"
 Halestorm
"Here's To Us" (#1 Rock Song iTunes) 
 Carly Hennessy
"Beautiful You"
"No One's Safe From Goodbye"
 Jamelia
"Tripping Over You"
 Leona Lewis
"Alive"
"Let It Rain"
 Lilygreen & Maguire
"Given Up Giving Up"
 Kimberley Locke
"Everyday Angels"
 Kylie Minogue
"Boombox"
"I'm Just Here For the Music"
"My Image Unlimited"
 Mandy Moore
"Someday We'll Know"
 Leigh Nash
"Just a Little"
 Ne-Yo, Johnny Rzeznik, Natasha Bedingfield, Herbie Hancock, Delta Rae
"Forward"
 New Radicals
"Someday We'll Know"
 Trine Rein
"Just Missed The Train"
 Samantha Stollenwerck
"Carefree"
"Is This My Life"
 Donna Summer
"Stamp Your Feet" (#1 Single Billboard Dance Chart)
"Driving Down Brazil"
"Crayons" featuring Ziggy Marley

Awards and nominations

Awards won
1981 Young Artist Award – Best Young Actress in a TV Special; for Mom, the Wolfman and Me1982 Young Artist Award – Best Young Actress in a Television Series; for Archie Bunker's Place2009 BMI – The Robert S. Musel Award; for "Pocketful of Sunshine"
2009 BMI – College Song; for "Pocketful of Sunshine"
2009 BMI – Pop Award; for "Pocketful of Sunshine"
2009 BMI – Cable Award; The HillsNominations
1980 Young Artist Award – Best Juvenile Actress in a TV Series or Special; for All in the Family1981 Young Artist Award – Best Young Actress in a Television Series; for Archie Bunker's Place1982 Golden Globe Award – Best Supporting Actress in a Series, Mini-Series or Motion Picture Made for TV; for Archie Bunker's Place1983 Young Artist Award – Best Young Actress in a Television Series; for Archie Bunker's Place1984 Young Artist Award – Best Young Actress in a Television Series; for Archie Bunker's Place''
2015 Academy Award – Best Original Song; for "Lost Stars" from Begin Again.

References

External links

1969 births
20th-century American actresses
Actresses from New York City
American child actresses
American women pop singers
American women rock singers
American women singer-songwriters
American film actresses
American multi-instrumentalists
American percussionists
American pop pianists
Record producers from New York (state)
American soap opera actresses
American television actresses
American voice actresses
EMI Records artists
Epic Records artists
Living people
RCA Records artists
Singers from New York City
Musicians from Brooklyn
American rock songwriters
20th-century American women singers
20th-century American women pianists
20th-century American pianists
21st-century American women singers
American people of French-Canadian descent
21st-century American women pianists
21st-century American pianists
American women record producers
20th-century American singers
Singer-songwriters from New York (state)